The 49 class are a class of diesel locomotives built by Clyde Engineering, Granville for the New South Wales Department of Railways between 1960 and 1964.

History

The 49 class was ordered in three batches each of six locomotives. They entered service in the Western Region of New South Wales and hauled trains on all branchlines as well as mainlines west of Lithgow. They periodically travelled as far a field as Moree in the north-west and Cootamundra in the south-west.

Between July and November 1989, the whole class was transferred to Delec Locomotive Depot in Sydney. As well as metropolitan trip workings they were used on coal trains to Tahmoor on the Main South line. In January 1994, they began to operate on the Illawarra line to Bombo on ballast trains.

In June 1994, the Manildra Group leased 4907 from FreightCorp for use at its Gunnedah mill. Later in 1994, Manildra purchased 4907 along with 4913 and had them rebuilt by Clyde Engineering, Kelso with lower No.1 ends, the second being for use at their Manildra mill. To haul infrastructure trains in Victoria during the Melbourne-Adelaide railway standard gauge conversion project, 4903, 4912 and 4916 were leased to National Rail in late 1994.

In February 1995, the remaining examples still in service with FreightCorp were withdrawn. Most were returned to traffic later in 1995 before again being withdrawn in July 1997. In April 1998, 4910 was leased for seven months to Northern Rivers Railroad hauling services between Grafton and Murwillumbah.

By 1999, the 49s had begun to be sold with 3801 Limited, Chicago Freight Car Leasing Australia, Consolidated Rail Leasing, Patrick Portlink and Southern Shorthaul Railroad among those to have operated them, with many having had more than one owner post FreightCorp. Northern Rivers Railroad purchased a number, although none entered service. They were either resold or stripped for spares with the bogies off some used to regauge Queensland Railways 1502 class locomotives when converted to the 423 class. Today a number remain in use with Consolidated Rail Leasing, Manildra Group and Southern Shorthaul Railroad. Preserved examples are currently operated by the Lachlan Valley Railway and the NSW Rail Museum.

Status Table

References

Further reading

Clyde Engineering locomotives
Co-Co locomotives
Diesel locomotives of New South Wales
Railway locomotives introduced in 1960
Standard gauge locomotives of Australia
Diesel-electric locomotives of Australia